Scott Michael Kelly (born July 16, 1967) is an American former musician. He was one of three founding members of California experimental metal band Neurosis, in which he was the band's lead vocalist and guitarist from its formation until his firing in 2019. Kelly retired from music in 2022 after admitting to abusing his family.

Aside from Neurosis, Kelly was also a member of the bands Tribes of Neurot, Blood and Time, Shrinebuilder, Corrections House, Mirrors of Psychic Warfare and Absent in Body. He released three solo albums. Kelly has also appeared on six albums by the American metal band Mastodon, featuring on all of their albums from 2004's Leviathan to 2017's Emperor of Sand.

Career 
Kelly formed Neurosis in 1985 originally as a hardcore punk band with bassist Dave Edwardson and drummer Jason Roeder. Kelly was the band's vocalist and guitarist, and the band released eleven studio albums together with him. Kelly was fired from Neurosis in 2019 after the band learned that he had been abusing his wife and children, but this remained unpublicized until 2022 for his family's protection. Kelly admitted to committing the abuse in August 2022 and announced his retirement from music and public life.

In Shrinebuilder, Kelly collaborated with Al Cisneros, Scott Weinrich, and Dale Crover, whose first and only album was released in October 2009. Kelly was also a member of the supergroup Absent in Body which formed in 2022, with Amenra's vocalist Colin H. Van Eeckhout and guitarist Mathieu J. Vandekerckhove alongside former Sepultura drummer Igor Cavalera.

In addition to his musical projects, Kelly, along with his bandmates in Neurosis, was co-owner of Neurot Recordings. Beginning in April 2011, he began hosting a monthly three hour streaming radio show on Scion A/V.com channel 5 called KMBT. He had previously owned and operated an Internet radio station of his own called combatmusicradio.com that featured weekly shows from him as well as others such as Eugene S. Robinson, Joe Preston, and others.

Kelly also worked extensively as a solo artist, releasing three albums and doing over 400 solo performances worldwide since the year 2000, including involving Neurosis bandmates in his The Road Home project.

Musical influences 
Kelly cites Swans, Black Flag, Black Sabbath, Pink Floyd, Die Kreuzen, Amebix, Jimi Hendrix, King Crimson, Neil Young, Melvins, Celtic Frost, Negative Approach, Townes Van Zandt, Voivod, and Hank Williams as important influences.

Personal life 
A native of the East Bay, Kelly used to reside with his wife Sarah and two youngest children in the woods of Southern Oregon. 

In August 2022, after admitting to abusing his wife and children, Kelly officially retired from music and public life, and his current living situation is unknown.

Discography 

Neurosis
Pain of Mind (1987)
The Word as Law (1990)
Souls at Zero (1992)
Enemy of the Sun (1993)
Through Silver in Blood (1996)
Times of Grace (1999)
A Sun That Never Sets (2001)
The Eye of Every Storm (2004)
Given to the Rising (2007)
Honor Found in Decay (2012)
Fires Within Fires (2016)

Neurosis & Jarboe
Neurosis & Jarboe (2003)

Tribes of Neurot
Rebegin (1995)
Silver Blood Transmission (1995)
Static Migration (1998)
Grace (1999)
60° (2000)
Adaptation and Survival: The Insect Project (2002)
Meridian (2005)

Solo albums
Spirit Bound Flesh (2001)
The Wake (2008)
The Forgiven Ghost in Me (2012)

Blood and Time
At the Foot of the Garden (2003)
Latitudes (2007)

Shrinebuilder
Shrinebuilder (2009)

Corrections House
Hoax the System / Grin with a Purpose (7") (2013)
Last City Zero (2013)
Know How to Carry a Whip (2015)

Mastodon (guest vocals)
Leviathan (on the track "Aqua Dementia") (2004)
Blood Mountain (on the track "Crystal Skull") (2006)
Crack the Skye (on the track "Crack the Skye") (2009)
The Hunter (on the track "Spectrelight") (2011)
Once More 'Round the Sun (on the track "Diamond in the Witch House") (2014)
Emperor of Sand (on the track "Scorpion Breath") (2017)
Medium Rarities (on the track "Fallen Torches") (2020)

Mirrors for Psychic Warfare
Mirrors for Psychic Warfare (2016)
I See What I Became (2018)

Absent in Body
Plague God (2022)

References

External links 

Official website
Scott Kelly's artist page on Neurot Recordings
'Return to Zero' (hosted by Scott Kelly) on Combat Music Radio

Living people
American country singer-songwriters
American male singer-songwriters
American heavy metal musicians
Musicians from Ashland, Oregon
1967 births
Singer-songwriters from Oregon
Shrinebuilder members
Neurosis (band) members